Troy was a legendary city described in Homer's Iliad.

Troy may also refer to:

Names
 Troy (given name)
 Troy (surname)

Media
 Troy (film), a 2004 film by Wolfgang Petersen
 Troy (TV series), a British TV series presented by Troy Von Scheibner
 Troy: Fall of a City, a British miniseries
 Troy (BBC radio drama), a 1998 series of radio plays by Andrew Rissik
 Troy, a character in the British web series Corner Shop Show

Literature
 Troy (novel), a 2000 young adult novel by Adèle Geras
 Troy (short story collection), by Simon Brown (2006)
 Troy Series, a 2005–2007 trilogy of books by David Gemmell
 Troy, a fictional world in which Lanfeust of Troy takes place

Music 
 Troy (opera), a 2018 Turkish opera
 "Troy" (song), a 1987 song by Sinéad O'Connor from The Lion and the Cobra
 "They Reminisce Over You (T.R.O.Y.)", a 1992 rap song by Pete Rock and CL Smooth from Mecca and the Soul Brother
 "Troy", a 1990 song by Robin Holcomb from Robin Holcomb

Places

Canada
 Troy, Municipality of the County of Inverness, Nova Scotia

United Kingdom
 Troy Town or Troy, some turf mazes in England
 Fowey, Cornwall or Troy Town

United States 
 Troy, Alabama
 Troy University
 Troy, Arizona
 Troy, California
 Troy, Idaho
 Troy, Illinois
 Troy, Indiana
 Troy, Iowa
 Troy Mills, Iowa
 Troy, Kansas
 Troy, Jessamine County, Kentucky
 Troy, Woodford County, Kentucky
 Troy, Maine
 Troy (Dorsey, Maryland), a historic house
 Troy, Michigan
 Troy, Minnesota
 Troy, Missouri
 Troy, Montana
 Troy, New Hampshire, a New England town
 Troy (CDP), New Hampshire, the main village in the town
 Troy, New York  
 Troy, North Carolina
 Troy, Ohio
 Troy, Pennsylvania
 Troy, South Carolina
 Troy, South Dakota
 Troy, Tennessee
 Troy, Texas
 Troy, Sauk County, Wisconsin, a town
 Troy, St. Croix County, Wisconsin, a town
 Troy, Walworth County, Wisconsin, a town
 Troy (community), Walworth County, Wisconsin, unincorporated community in the town
 Troy Center, Wisconsin, unincorporated community in the town
 Troy, Vermont, a New England town
 Troy (CDP), Vermont, village within the town
 Troy, Virginia
 Troy, West Virginia

Vessels 
 Troy (submarine), a small submarine in the shape of a Great White Shark
 Troy class boats, boats unique to Fowey in Cornwall and raced competitively

Science 
 Troy weight, a system of measurements for weight and mass commonly used in describing the "size" of precious metals and gemstones
 TNFRSF19 or TROY, a human gene

Other uses
 Troy (card scheme), domestic payment card scheme of Turkey
 Troy (chess variant), a chess variant created by the Fanaat games club
 Troy (horse), a British Thoroughbred racehorse
 Troy (roller coaster), a wooden roller coaster in the Netherlands
 Chad Fortune or Troy, American professional wrestler

See also 
 Helen of Troy (disambiguation)
 South Troy (disambiguation)
 Troi (disambiguation)
 Troy High School (disambiguation)
 Troy Township (disambiguation)  
 Troye (disambiguation)
 The Troys